Statistics of Empress's Cup in the 1982 season.

Overview
It was contested by 12 teams, and Shimizudaihachi SC won the championship.

Results

1st Round
IMO SC 0-2 Shimizu FC Mama
Chiba Gakuen High School 0-5 FC PAF
Nishiyama Club 4-0 Molten Habatake
Kobe FC 10-0 Hiroshima Oko FC

Quarterfinals
FC Jinnan 6-0 Shimizu FC Mama
Takatsuki FC 2-0 FC PAF
Nishiyama Club 1-1 (pen 0-2) FC Kodaira
Kobe FC 0-4 Shimizudaihachi SC

Semifinals
FC Jinnan 1-0 Takatsuki FC
FC Kodaira 0-6 Shimizudaihachi SC

Final
FC Jinnan 0-6 Shimizudaihachi SC
Shimizudaihachi SC won the championship.

References

Empress's Cup
1982 in Japanese women's football